Generally, the speed limits in Singapore are 50 km/h unless stated otherwise. The speed limit is restricted to 40 km/h in School Zones and Silver Zones. Most expressways have speed limits of either 80 km/h or 90 km/h.
Offenders who are caught speeding will be fined and given demerit points, fine or face prosecution.

References

Singapore